Zoom Zoom may refer to:
Mazda catchphrase/trademark
Joel Zumaya's nickname
Zoom zoom!, catchphrase of Lauren Luke, English makeup artist
Zoom-Zoom-Zoom, song
Mazda Zoom-Zoom Stadium Hiroshima